The 2022 Hawaii Bowl was a college football bowl game played on December 24, 2022, at Clarence T. C. Ching Athletics Complex in Honolulu, Hawaii. The 19th annual Hawaii Bowl, the game featured the Middle Tennessee Blue Raiders from Conference USA (C-USA) and the San Diego State Aztecs from the Mountain West Conference. The game began at 3:03 p.m. HST (8:03 p.m. EST) and was aired on ESPN. It was one of the 2022–23 bowl games concluding the 2022 FBS football season. Sponsored by shipping API EasyPost, the game was officially known as the EasyPost Hawaii Bowl. Due to cancellations in 2020 and 2021 for COVID-19 related issues, this was the first Hawaii Bowl since 2019.

Teams
The Hawaii Bowl featured the Middle Tennessee Blue Raiders from Conference USA (C–USA) and the San Diego State Aztecs from the Mountain West Conference (MWC). This was the first meeting between the two teams.

Middle Tennessee

Middle Tennessee entered the bowl with a 7–5 record (4–4 in conference). Middle Tennessee finished tied for fourth in the final Conference-USA standings for the season, posting the same conference record as both UAB and Florida Atlantic. This was Middle Tennessee's 14th bowl game appearance and 9th at the NCAA Division I level, with a prior record of 5–8 in bowl games (3–6 at Division I). It was Middle Tennessee's second appearance in the Hawaii Bowl, having previously played in the 2016 edition.

San Diego State

San Diego State entered the bowl with a 7–5 record (5–3 in conference). San Diego State tied for second in the West Division of the Mountain West Conference with San Jose State. This was San Diego State's 20th bowl game appearance, with a prior record of 10–9 in bowl games. This was San Diego State's second Hawaii Bowl appearance, having previously played in the 2015 edition. It was also San Diego State's third postseason game in Honolulu; the school played in the 1952 Pineapple Bowl where they defeated Hawaii, 34–13.

Game summary

Statistics

References

Hawaii Bowl
Hawaii Bowl
Hawaii Bowl
Hawaii Bowl
Middle Tennessee Blue Raiders football bowl games
San Diego State Aztecs football bowl games